Tom Johnson (born November 18, 1939) is an American minimalist composer.

Early life and career 
Tom Johnson was born in Greeley, Colorado, where he received a religious education at a Methodist church, which has influenced his work. He received two degrees from Yale, a B.A. (1961) and the M.Mus. (1967), after which he studied privately with Morton Feldman in New York. From 1971 to 1983 he was a music critic for The Village Voice, writing about new music, and an anthology of these articles was published in 1989 by Het Apollohuis under the title The Voice of New Music. During this period he also composed four of his best known works: An Hour for Piano (1971), The Four-Note Opera (1972), Failing (1975) and Nine Bells (1979). After 15 years in New York, he moved to Paris where he lives with his wife, the artist Esther Ferrer.

Johnson considers himself a minimalist composer, and was the first to apply this term to music in his article "The Slow-Motion Minimal Approach”, written for The Village Voice in 1972. His minimalism is of a formalist type, depending mostly on logical sequences, as in the 21 Rational Melodies (1982), where he explores procedures such as accumulation, counting, and isorhythm.
 
After the Rational Melodies, he developed more complex techniques using mathematical notions. This began with the collection of Music for 88 (1988), where he applied ideas of Eratosthenes, Euler, Mersenne and Blaise Pascal. Later he collaborated with living mathematicians, particularly Jean-Paul Allouche, Emmanuel Amiot, Jeff Dinitz and Franck Jedrzejewski. With them he explored the notions of self-similar melodies (Loops for orchestra, 1998), tiling patterns (Tilework, 2003), and block designs (Block Design for Piano, 2005), along with homometric pairs (Intervals, 2013).

Johnson also introduces text and visual images to produce a theatrical atmosphere close to performance art. The librettos for his operas, which he almost always writes himself, describe what takes place in the music in an objective manner, somewhat reminiscent of Pirandello. For example, in The Four-Note Opera, the chorus proclaims “There are three choruses in this opera. This is the first one. The second one will be almost like this one, but somewhat shorter […]”.
Words intervene in many of his works, generally via a narrator, who explains pedagogically how the music is made, as is the case in Eggs and Baskets (1987) and Narayana’s Cows (1989). From 1988 to 1992, Johnson worked on the Bonhoeffer Oratorio for two choruses, soloists and orchestra, using exclusively texts of the German pastor and theologian Dietrich Bonhoeffer (1906–1945). The association of text and music led Johnson to write numerous radio pieces, most often for René Farabet (France Culture) and for Klaus Schöning (WDR). Some humor often emerges in these pieces, due to a light touch of absurdity, as the music presents itself as if giving a course in music.

The visual also plays an important role in Nine Bells (1979), a piece written for nine bells suspended in a three by three square, with one bell in the center. The player moves around this square, hitting bells along the way, following paths that are quite varied but always systematic. In Galileo (1999-2005), bells swing like pendulums in tempos determined by the length of their strings, permitting the composer to make music following the laws of the pendulum, as formulated by Galileo Galilei in the 17th century.

Since 2000 the work of Johnson has been less concerned with theatricality and turns more toward musical form and mathematics. From about 2004 to 2010 he worked with what he calls “rational harmonies” in pieces like 360 Chords for orchestra (2005) and Twelve (2008) for piano. Rhythm plays an important role in pieces such as Vermont Rhythms (2008), Munich Rhythms (2010), Tick-Tock Rhythms (2013), and Dutch Rhythms (2018). Johnson also wrote pieces for jugglers (Three Notes for Three Jugglers, 2011; Dropping Balls, 2011), and several more ambitious projects (Seven Septets, 2007–2017 ; Counting to Seven, 2013 ; Plucking, 2015).

References

 Finding Music. Writings/Schriften. 1961–2018. (EN/DE). Musiktexte, Köln 2019,

External
Conversations avec Tom Johnson, book of interviews by Bernard Girard
Johnson, Tom (1989). The Voice of New Music: New York City 1972-1982 -- A Collection of Articles Originally Published by the  Village Voice
Tom Johnson biography
Tom Johnson Editions 75
Some Observations on Tiling Problems by Tom Johnson
An Hour for Piano streamed online produced by Irritable Hedgehog Music
Lovely Music Artist: Tom Johnson
NewMusicBox.org: Tom Johnson answers: "What role has theory played in your compositions and how important is it for people to know the theory behind the music in order to appreciate it?"
NewMusicBox.org: View From The East: An Old Friend By Greg Sandow © 2003 NewMusicBox
Bonhoeffer Oratorium Program Notes
"Tiling In My Music"
Podcast in which Tom Johnson talks about his compositional methods, and the influence that John Cage and Morton Feldman had upon it.

1939 births
20th-century classical composers
21st-century classical composers
American male classical composers
American classical composers
India Navigation artists
Living people
21st-century American composers
20th-century American composers
20th-century American male musicians
21st-century American male musicians